Haplopappus is a genus of flowering plants in the family Asteraceae found in South America, mostly restricted to the dry regions of the Southern Andes, Chilean Matorral, and Patagonia.

Species accepted by the Plants of the World Online as of December 2022: 

 formerly included
Many species once included in Haplopappus are now regarded as belonging to other genera:  Acamptopappus Ageratina Aztecaster Benitoa Croptilon Ericameria Grindelia Gundlachia Haploesthes Hazardia Inulopsis Isocoma Leptostelma Llerasia Lorandersonia Machaeranthera Nestotus Noticastrum Oonopsis Oreochrysum Oreostemma Osbertia Pyrrocoma Rayjacksonia Stenotus Toiyabea Tonestus Xanthisma

References

 
Asteraceae genera
Taxonomy articles created by Polbot